Tapalapa bread is a traditional bread, mainly in Senegal, The Gambia and Guinea. It is shaped like a typical French baguette.

It served with Akara, beans, steam fish among other Gambian dishes. It is mainly made in local bakeries. It is sold by the Fulas in The Gambia as they are most common for trade of goods.

The main ingredient is flour and yeast.
 List of African dishes
 List of African cuisines
 List of breads
 Cuisine of Gambia
 Cuisine of Senegal
 Cuisine of Guinea

References

Breads
Gambian cuisine
Senegalese cuisine